The Yamaha YZ250 is a two-stroke motocross race bike made by Yamaha. The model was launched in 1974, and has been regularly updated and is still in production with new releases every year.

Engine
The original YZ250 of 1974 used an air-cooled 250cc two-stroke engine of 70 mm bore and a 64 mm stroke, which was improved semi-annually. The air-cooled motor was replaced in 1982 with a 249 cc liquid-cooled two-stroke reed-valved engine with a YPVS exhaust valve for a wider spread of power. The bore on the water-cooled engine was reduced to 68 mm and the stroke was increased to 68 mm producing a displacement of 247 cc. In 1999, the bore was further reduced to 66.4 mm and the stroke lengthened to 72 mm producing a displacement of 249 cc. The longer stroke engine resulted in a lower redline, slightly less top end power and greatly improved torque at lower RPM.

Chassis
On its introduction in 1974, the YZ250 used a single backbone steel frame with a twin-shock swingarm. The following year, reflecting the factory racer Hakan Andersson's factory racer, the swingarm became a monoshock unit, initially made of steel, then aluminum from 1978. The swingarm rear suspension system featured more than 12" of travel, while the telescopic inverted front forks had  of travel. All YZ250s feature front and rear hydraulic disc brakes.

Timeline

Racing
 5 AMA National Motocross Titles
 9 AMA National Supercross Titles
 AMA National Supercross 2004 championship, by Chad Reed.
 6-time AMA National Offroad Championships by Jason Raines

See also
 YZ85
 YZ125
 YZ250F

References

YZ250
Off-road motorcycles
Motorcycles introduced in 1974
Two-stroke motorcycles